Superliga Ecuatoriana de Fútbol Femenino, also commonly known as Superliga Femenina, is the highest league of women's football in Ecuador, organized by the Ecuadorian Football Federation. Since its founding in 2019, the league has been contested for 2 years and 2 titles have been awarded.

History

Background

In 2013, the first national amateur women's football championship endorsed by the FEF was organized. None of these 16 participating clubs belonged to or were subsidiaries of the Ecuadorian Serie A men's clubs. They are teams that have been carrying out this activity at the neighborhood or amateur level for 15 and even 20 years, there is no exact date.

Formation
In 2019, the FEF created the Women's Football Commission to be in charge of the creation of a new professional women's football league which included the participation of the Serie A teams from Ecuador. In this tournament, the teams will be able to register players in a professional manner, although it is not an obligation that the entire teams are to be.

Sponsorship
On 29 August 2019, the Ecuadorian Football Federation reached an agreement with DirecTV for the transmission of the final stage of the 2019 season.

List of champions

Titles by club

References

External links 
Federation website

Football leagues in Ecuador
Ecuador
Recurring sporting events established in 2019
Women's sports leagues in Ecuador